Bow Valley is a valley located along the upper Bow River in Alberta, Canada.

Community
There are several communities in the Bow Valley, including Banff, Canmore, Kananaskis, and the hamlets of Dead Man's Flats, Exshaw, Harvie Heights, Lac des Arcs, and Lake Louise. Local residents are culturally diverse, with growing immigration trends since the early 2000s.

Parks

Bow Valley Provincial Park (part of the Kananaskis Country park system) was established east of the Canadian Rockies in the arch of the valley, while the upper course of the Bow River flows through Banff National Park. The Canmore Nordic Centre Provincial Park is located between the Banff National Park and Canmore in the Bow River Valley.

Numerous other recreation areas dot the valley. Provincial Recreation Areas are established at Three Sisters, Gap Lake, Grotto Mountain, Lac des Arcs, Heart Ridge, Heart Mountain, Ghost Reservoir and other locations.

Lakes
Many lakes, glacial and artificial, are found in the Bow Valley:
Bow Lake
Hector Lake
Vermilion Lakes
Lake Louise
Gap Lake
Lac des Arcs
Ghost Lake

References

Valleys of Alberta